Aron is a masculine given name and a surname. It is an alternate spelling of Aaron, prominent biblical figure in the Old Testament.  The name Aron means Teaching, Singing and is of Hebrew origin.
The name means "mountaineer", or "mount of strength". There are given name and surname variants.
People with the name Aron include:

Given name

 Ahron Ben-Shmuel, American sculptor
 Aron (singer), American singer
 Aron K. Barbey (born 1977), American neuroscientist
 Aron Baynes, Australian basketball player
 Aron Bogolyubov (b. 1938), Soviet Olympic medalist judoka
 Aron Cotruș (1891–1961), Romanian poet and diplomat 
 Aron Eisenberg
 Aron Erlichman
 Aron Gurwitsch
 Aron Kader
 Aron Katsenelinboigen
 Aron Kincaid
 Aron Nimzowitsch
 Aron Pumnul
 Aron Ralston
 Aron Steuer (1898–1985), American lawyer and judge
 Aron Strobel
 Aron Tager
 Aron Teixeira da Silva (born 1983), Brazilian footballer
 Aron Tiranul
 Aron Wright, American singer, songwriter, producer, and recording artist
 Aron Wright (born September 30, 1810), American Physician
 Aron Williams - Leading Aviation Safety Consultant, UK

Middle Name
 Elvis Aron Presley (sometimes written Aaron in a literary mistake), American musician
 Bryce Aron Max Harper, Professional American baseball outfielder

Surname
Arthur Aron (born 1945), American psychologist
Bill Aron, American photographer
Elaine Aron, American psychologist
Geraldine Aron (born 1951), Irish playwright
Hermann Aron (1845–1913), German Jewish electrical engineer and physicist
Jean-Paul Aron (1925–1988), French writer, philosopher and journalist
Michael Aron (born 1959), British ambassador
Pal Aron (born 1971), British actor
Paul Aron (born 2004), Estonian racing driver
Petru Aron (died 1467), Prince of Moldavia
Pietro Aron (c.1480–after 1545), Italian music theorist and composer
Praveen Singh Aron (born 1959), Indian politician
Ralf Aron (born 1998), Estonian racing driver
Raymond Aron (1905–1983), French philosopher, sociologist, journalist, and political scientist
Robert Aron (1898–1975), French Jewish writer
Ruthann Aron (born 1942), American former politician and convicted criminal
Wellesley Aron (1901–1988), Briton active in Palestine, then Israel

See also
 Aaron (given name)
 Aaron (surname)
 Arron, given name and surname
 Aarons (surname)
 Aaronson, surname

References

Given names
Masculine given names
Jewish surnames
Romanian-language surnames
Romanian masculine given names